Acacia ayersiana is a plant that grows in arid areas of Australia.

Description
It has blue-grey phyllodes, and yellow flowers from September to October. The branchlets are covered with small white hairs have resinous red-brown coloured ribs with red hairs on new growth. Like most species of Acacia it has phyllodes rather than true leaves.

Taxonomy
It was first published by John Maconochie in 1978, based on specimen material collected by him at Ayers Rock in 1930. It is closely related to A. aneura (Mulga).

There are two varieties: A. a. var. ayersiana and A. a. var. latifolia.

Distribution
It is widely distributed throughout arid and semi-arid parts of Australia, occurring in Western Australia, South Australia, and southern parts of the Northern Territory. It is usually found in red sandy or loamy soils, often along creek lines or in the swales of dunes.

See also
List of Acacia species

References

ayersiana
Flora of the Northern Territory
Flora of South Australia
Acacias of Western Australia
Fabales of Australia
Plants described in 1978